Udayanga Weeratunga is a Sri Lankan businessman who was the Ambassador Extraordinary and Plenipotentiary of the Democratic Socialist Republic of Sri Lanka to the Russian Federation from 2006 to 2015. Weeratunga is a first cousin of President Mahinda Rajapaksa and

Early life and education
Udayanga was born in Medamulana and received his education from Nalanda College, Colombo.

Career
Weeratunga presented his Letter of Credence to the president Vladimir Putin of Russia on 16 November 2006. He served as the ambassador to Russia until president Rajapaksa's defeat in the 2015 Sri Lankan presidential election. 

In 2015, Weeratunga was accused by the Ukrainian government of arms sales to the separatist rebels fighting government forces in Ukraine. The Sri Lankan government is currently investigating these allegations and withdrawn his diplomatic passport but his whereabouts are not known to the Sri Lankan authorities.The Financial Crimes Investigation Division applied for, but did not receive, an Interpol warrant for his arrest on 30 September 2016.

MiG-27 purchase controversy
Weeratunga was extradited from Dubai to Sri Lanka on February 14, 2020 and arrested by officers of the Criminal Investigation Department (CID) on charges of kickbacks and money laundering from the Sri Lankan military's 2006 purchase of four second-hand MiG-27 aircraft from Ukraine. At the time of the purchase, president Rajapaksa was the secretary to the ministry of defence. 

Sixteen banks accounts of Weeratunga had been suspended by the courts in January 2017 due to allegations of fraud in the purchase of Mig-27 fighters. The case is ongoing without Weeratunga not attending the court. Investigations had revealed that funds amounting to a total of US$1.5 million had been deposited at various times to the sixteen accounts belonging to him with the Sri Lankan Air Force claiming that they are unable to locate the original purchase contract, which is said to have been signed in the presence of the Weeratunga.

Weeratunge was arrested in Dubai on 4 February 2018, by international police based on a request made by Sri Lankan Authorities.

See also
List of Sri Lankan non-career diplomats

References 

Sinhalese businesspeople
Sri Lankan Buddhists
Alumni of Nalanda College, Colombo
Sri Lankan diplomats
Ambassadors of Sri Lanka to Russia
Living people
Rajapaksa family
Year of birth missing (living people)